Puttin' on the Hits is an American syndicated music/variety competition show that was hosted and written by Allen Fawcett. The show featured amateur acts lip-synching to popular songs. The show aired on weekends from 1984 to 1988. The show's title is a reference (and spoof) to Irving Berlin's 1929 song  & Taco's 1983 cover Puttin' on the Ritz.

Description
The show grew out of lip synching contests developed by William "Randy" Wood, who by 1982 had realized that his contests had grown so popular nationally that he needed to stage them on a broader scale. The planning process eventually grew into Puttin' on the Hits with Chris Bearde and Dick Clark serving as executive producers. Clark's son, Richard A. Clark, produced with Wood serving as the consulting producer. MCA Television served as distributor. Puttin' on the Hits was taped in Hollywood, California at Universal City Studios.

Contestants would often dress up in costumes and use props to make their act more outrageous. This varied from a seemingly severed head singing "I Ain't Got Nobody" to an Aretha Franklin drag act using couch cushions for breasts. Other acts were more conservative and placed emphasis on performance.

The competition was conducted as many other televised performance contests (e.g. Star Search) were. Each act was judged by a panel of celebrity judges based on their originality, appearance & lip-sync abilities. The judges could award a maximum of ten points per category, and their score totals were combined to give an act a total score of up to ninety points. In the event of a tie, the judges made a final decision to determine each winner. Each season was conducted as a tournament. Winners of a preliminary round received $1,000. Winning in the semifinal round was worth $5,000 to an act. At the end of the season, the winners of the semifinals competed in a grand championship final with $25,000 going to the winning act. Each contestant was given complimentary gifts and a videotape of their performance.

Following the conclusion of the fourth season's tournament, the three previous season champions were invited back to compete once more against the winner of that season. The winning act won an additional $25,000.

Puttin' on the Hits has been credited with launching the career of the group Troop, and Jazzmun, a drag performer who can be seen in many contemporary television shows. Kato Kaelin was another notable contestant, appearing during the show's third season performing Steppenwolf's "Born to Be Wild".

Kids' version
A short-lived spinoff called Puttin' on the Kids hosted by Michael Young also aired in the 1986–87 television season, also distributed in syndication. Celebrity judges awarded savings bonds to two weekly winners.

See also
 Great Pretenders
 Lip Service
 Lip Sync Battle

References

External links
 

1980s American music television series
1984 American television series debuts
1988 American television series endings
First-run syndicated television programs in the United States
Singing talent shows
Television series by Universal Television
Television series by Dick Clark Productions